Alen Bošković (born 28 October 1971) is a Croatian water polo player. He competed in the men's tournament at the 2000 Summer Olympics.

References

1971 births
Living people
Croatian male water polo players
Olympic water polo players of Croatia
Water polo players at the 2000 Summer Olympics
Sportspeople from Dubrovnik